The 1955 Allan Cup was the Canadian senior ice hockey championship for the 1954–55 senior "A" season.  The event was hosted by the Kitchener-Waterloo Flying Dutchmen and Kitchener, Ontario.  The 1955 playoff marked the 47th time that the Allan Cup has been awarded.

Teams
Kitchener-Waterloo Flying Dutchmen (Eastern Canadian Champions)
Fort William Beavers (Western Canadian Champions)

Playdowns

Allan Cup Best-of-Seven Series
Kitchener-Waterloo Flying Dutchmen 3 - Fort William Beavers 2
Fort William Beavers 6 - Kitchener-Waterloo Flying Dutchmen 4
Kitchener-Waterloo Flying Dutchmen 6 - Fort William Beavers 2
Kitchener-Waterloo Flying Dutchmen 7 - Fort William Beavers 6
Kitchener-Waterloo Flying Dutchmen 5 - Fort William Beavers 3

Eastern Playdowns
Semi-final
Kitchener-Waterloo Flying Dutchmen defeated Sault Ste. Marie Greyhounds 4-games-to-3
Sault Ste. Marie Greyhounds 1 - Kitchener-Waterloo Flying Dutchmen 0
Kitchener-Waterloo Flying Dutchmen 2 - Sault Ste. Marie Greyhounds 0
Sault Ste. Marie Greyhounds 2 - Kitchener-Waterloo Flying Dutchmen 1
Kitchener-Waterloo Flying Dutchmen 4 - Sault Ste. Marie Greyhounds 1
Sault Ste. Marie Greyhounds 5 - Kitchener-Waterloo Flying Dutchmen 3
Kitchener-Waterloo Flying Dutchmen 2 - Sault Ste. Marie Greyhounds 1
Kitchener-Waterloo Flying Dutchmen 6 - Sault Ste. Marie Greyhounds 1
Moncton Hawks defeated Ottawa RCAF Flyers 4-games-to-none
Moncton Hawks 4 - Ottawa RCAF Flyers 1
Moncton Hawks 5 - Ottawa RCAF Flyers 3
Moncton Hawks 7 - Ottawa RCAF Flyers 2
Moncton Hawks 7 - Ottawa RCAF Flyers 3
Final
Kitchener-Waterloo Flying Dutchmen defeated Moncton Hawks 4-games-to-1
Kitchener-Waterloo Flying Dutchmen 6 - Moncton Hawks 2
Kitchener-Waterloo Flying Dutchmen 8 - Moncton Hawks 4
Kitchener-Waterloo Flying Dutchmen 5 - Moncton Hawks 2
Moncton Hawks 6 - Kitchener-Waterloo Flying Dutchmen 0
Kitchener-Waterloo Flying Dutchmen 6 - Moncton Hawks 0

Western Playdowns
Semi-final
Vernon Canadians defeated Yorkton Terriers 4-games-to-2
Yorkton Terriers 6 - Vernon Canadians 5
Vernon Canadians 10 - Yorkton Terriers 1
Vernon Canadians 10 - Yorkton Terriers 1
Yorkton Terriers 5 - Vernon Canadians 4
Vernon Canadians 4 - Yorkton Terriers 3
Vernon Canadians 3 - Yorkton Terriers 2
Fort William Beavers defeated Winnipeg Maroons 4-games-to-none with 1 tie
Fort William Beavers 9 - Winnipeg Maroons 2
Fort William Beavers 4 - Winnipeg Maroons 2
Fort William Beavers 3 - Winnipeg Maroons 1
Fort William Beavers 5 - Winnipeg Maroons 5
Fort William Beavers 3 - Winnipeg Maroons 0
Final
Fort William Beavers defeated Vernon Canadians 4-games-to-2
Fort William Beavers 2 - Vernon Canadians 1
Fort William Beavers 3 - Vernon Canadians 1
Vernon Canadians 7 - Fort William Beavers 3
Fort William Beavers 4 - Vernon Canadians 1
Vernon Canadians 7 - Fort William Beavers 3
Fort William Beavers 3 - Vernon Canadians 2

External links
Allan Cup archives 
Allan Cup website

Allan Cup
Allan Cup